Zamia neurophyllidia is a species of plant in the family Zamiaceae. It is found in Costa Rica, Nicaragua, and Panama (Bocas del Toro Province). It is threatened by habitat loss due to human presence.

References

neurophyllidia
Flora of Costa Rica
Flora of Nicaragua
Flora of Panama
Taxonomy articles created by Polbot